is a Japanese tarento and comedian. She was born in Tahara, Aichi, and is part of the comedy duo Oasiz, with Kayoko Okubo.

Filmography

Current appearances

Former appearances

TV dramas

Films

Advertisements

Stage

Bibliography

Serials

References

External links
 

Japanese women comedians
People from Tahara, Aichi
1971 births
Living people